Momin Prohod is a health resort and spa located in western Bulgaria. Geographically, it is located in the Southwest part of Sredna Gora mountain. In 2006, it obtained administrative autonomy and the status of town (град).

The resort is an important therapeutic and rehabilitation center. The water of Momin Prohod is second to that of the Narechenski Bani spa in its radioactivity, third in Europe, and 25th in the world.

Info
Average annual temperature - + 10,5о С.
Mineral water - hyperthermal 65 to 68о С, weakly mineral, sulphate-sodium, moderately fluoric.
Main health factors - mineral water and mud, electric-treatment and thermal procedures

Gallery

References

Towns in Bulgaria
Populated places in Sofia Province
Spa towns in Bulgaria